Jean-Maurice Bourges (Bordeaux, 2 December 1812 - Paris, 15 March 1881), distinguished musical critic, translator and composer who came early to Paris to study composition under Auguste Barbereau. He became joint-editor for Revue et gazette musicale de Paris from 1839, which acquired an excellent reputation in great measure owing to him.

He made a translation of the words of St. Matthew Passion by Johann Sebastian Bach in 1843, the oratorio Paulus by Mendelssohn in 1844 and Brandus' edition of Elijah (1851), and several librettos of operas by Carl Maria von Weber until writing his own comic opera La Sultana in 1846,  successfully produced at the Opéra Comique. He died in 1881, after an illness of many years.

Selected works

Opera
 Le Choix d'une Amie, Opéra-comique en un acte. Paroles et musique de M. Bourges.
 Le Pandour, Fragments d'opéra-comique. Paroles et musique de M. Bourges.
 L'éventail d'Espagne, Opéra-comique en deux actes. Paroles et musique de M. Bourges.
 Sultana, Opéra-comique en un acte. Paroles de Edouard Monnais et de Auguste de Forges; premiered 16 September 1846 in Paris at the Théâtre Royal de l'Opéra Comique

Chamber music
 Piano Trio No. 1 in A minor
 Piano Trio No. 2
 Quatuor pour deux violons (Quartet for Two Violins)
 Romance for violin and piano
 3 Sonatas for violin and piano
 Sonate en Si bémol
 Sonate en Fa mineur
 Sonate en Ré majeur
 Sonate en sol (Sonata in G) for viola and piano
 String Quartet

Piano
 Amaryllis, Redowa
 Chant du Cloître
 Daphné, Schottisch
 Le Bouquet de Marguerite, Valse
 Ouverture d'un opéra comique inédit
 Paolina, Valse
 Speranza, Mélodie

Piano 4-hands
 Alfaïma, sultane de Grenade, Symphonie chevaleresque en quatre parties pour piano à 4 mains
 Marche funèbre
 Grenade au temps des Maures
 Nuit de fête aux jardins du généralife
 Le jugement de Dieu
 Le Couronnement de la Rosière pour piano à 4 mains
 Marche cortège pour piano à 4 mains
 Marche des Francs Vainqueurs à Tolbiac, Composition de caractère pour piano à 4 mains
 4 Pièces à quatre mains pour piano
 Cortège-Ballet
 Les Noces d'Or
 Musette Tambourin
 Tertullia.
 5 Pièces de caractère pour piano à 4 mains
 1er Fragment de Ballet
 2e Fragment de Ballet
 Marche-Cortège pour une Féerie
 Procession de Pénitents, Marche
 Marche Noble
 Scène de Village pour piano à 4 mains

Vocal and choral
 Ave Maria, Motet
 Ave, Regina coelorum, Chœur à 4 parties
 Ave Verum, Motet
 Beata Genovefa, Oratorio
 Chant d'étudiants, Solo et canon à 3 parties avec accompagnement de piano. Paroles et musique par M. Bourges.
 3 Chants religieux à 4 et 7 parties avec accompagnement d'orgue ou piano. Paroles et musique de M. Bourges.
 Réveil de Matines, Chœur à 4 parties
 Motet Funèbre à 4 parties
 Les Cloches de Pâques, à 7 parties
 3 Chœurs à 4 parties pour 2 dessus, ténor et basse avec accompagnement de piano. Paroles et musique de M. Bourges.
 Les Anges des Orphelins
 Herminie chez les Bergers
 Le Réveil des Chasseurs
 5 Chœurs ou Trios avec accompagnement de piano. Paroles et musique de M. Bourges.
 L'Adieu des Compagnons, Chœur à 3 parties pour voix d'hommes sans accompagnement
 Sérénade à 3 voix d'hommes
 Adieu à l'Épousée, Chœur-Trio
 La Matineuse, Trio de salon
 Les Willis de Saintonge, à 3 parties
 Dans la Retraite, Trio de salon pour deux dessus et un baryton avec accompagnement de piano. Paroles et musique de M. Bourges.
 Derniers beaux jours, Chant d'automne pour mezzo-soprano et contralto ou baryton et basse avec accompagnement de piano. Paroles et musique de M. Bourges.
 Inviolata, Motet à 4 parties
 L'Adieu des Compagnons, Chant en chœur à 3 parties pour voix d'hommes sans accompagnement. Paroles et musique de M. Bourges.
 Laudate Dominum, Motet
 Le Chant de l'Orgie, Chant à 2 parties pour voix d'hommes avec accompagnement de piano. Paroles et musique de M. Bourges.
 Le Fils prodigue, Oratorio français d'après la parabole du Chapitre XV. de l'Évangile selon St. Luc. Paroles et musique de M. Bourges.
 Le Triomphe de l'Amour, Chœur à 5 parties avec accompagnement de piano. Paroles de Jean de La Fontaine.
 Les Religieux du Saint-Bernard, Chœur à 4 parties sans accompagnement. Paroles et musique de M. Bourges.
 Les Songes Heureux, Chœur de salon à 3 parties avec solo et accompagnement de piano. Paroles et musique de M. Bourges.
 Messe à quatre voix
 Moïse sur le Nil, Oratorio française
 29 Motets à une, deux, trois et 4 voix avec accompagnement d'orgue ou de piano
 O sacrum Convivium, Motet
 O Salutaris, Motet
 O Salutaris hostia, Chœur
 Regina coeli laetare, Chœur à 3 parties
 Salve Regina, Motet à 2 voix
 Sancta Maria, ora pro nobis, Cantique
 Solitudine, ou Loin d'Elle, Mélodie pour baryton ou mezzo soprano avec violon obligé et accompagnement de piano. Musique et texte français par M. Bourges.
 Stabat à 4 voix avec accompagnement d'orgue ou de piano
 Veni Creator Spiritus

References

External links
 
 

French classical composers
People from Bordeaux
19th-century classical composers
19th-century male musicians
19th-century musicians
Male classical composers
1812 births
1881 deaths